Ermelo is a railway station located in Ermelo, Netherlands. The station was opened on 1 June 1882 (an official report from the then operating company NCS also mentions 1-6-1882 as the official opening date) and is located on the Amersfoort–Zwolle section of the Utrecht–Kampen railway (Centraalspoorweg). The station is operated by Nederlandse Spoorwegen. It was previously called Ermelo- Veldwijk (1863-1952).

Train services
The following services currently call at Ermelo:

Bus services

References

External links
NS website 
Dutch Public Transport journey planner 

1863 establishments in the Netherlands
Buildings and structures in Ermelo, Netherlands
Railway stations in Gelderland
Railway stations opened in 1863
Railway stations on the Centraalspoorweg
Railway stations in the Netherlands opened in the 19th century